Keepers of the House is the debut novel of Lisa St Aubin de Terán, published as The Long Way Home in the US. The novel is autobiographical and set in a Venezuelan valley beset by drought. First published in 1982 by Jonathan Cape it won the Somerset Maugham Award.

Plot introduction
The story concerns Lydia an Englishwoman who has married Diego, the second to last survivor of the Beltrán family.  They return to La Bebella, a dilapidated mansion on a neglected estate upon which years of drought and disease have taken their toll. Only Benito, her husband's retainer, remains and when her husband becomes depressed and a virtual recluse, Lydia has to take on the management of the estate with its sparse avocado and sugar cane crops. Benito recounts to her the history of the family and its gradual decline and it is this history and the characters concerned which forms the bulk of the narrative.

References

1982 British novels
British autobiographical novels
Family saga novels
Novels set in Venezuela
English novels
Jonathan Cape books
1982 debut novels